The NeverEnding Story III: Escape from Fantasia (also known as: The NeverEnding Story III: Return to Fantasia) is a 1994 fantasy-adventure film. It is the third and final film in the franchise. It stars Jason James Richter as Bastian Balthazar Bux, and Jack Black in an early role as school bully Slip. This film primarily used the characters from Michael Ende's novel The Neverending Story (1979), with the exception of Atreyu, who is absent from the film, and introduced a new storyline. It was an international co-production between the United States and Germany.

The special creature effects were provided by Jim Henson's Creature Shop.

Plot 
In a prologue, the Old Man of Wandering Mountain reads from a large book, begins to record a prophecy of a day when "The Nasty" will arrive in Fantasia, and describes the savior of "Extraordinary Courage".

Bastian Balthazar Bux is now 13 years old, and his father Barney has married a woman named Jane, and moved into her house in a new neighborhood. Jane's daughter Nicole is displeased at having a new family. Bastian has also started high school, where he has become a victim of the Nasties, a quintet of bullies led by Slip. Bastian arranges for them to be expelled with the help of the janitor after the Nasties trap him in the boiler room.

He later flees to the library, where he is surprised to find Carl Conrad Coreander and the Neverending Story. The Nasties locate him, but he uses the book to escape to Fantasia, where he is reunited with Falkor, Engywook and Urgl. On Earth, the Nasties find the Neverending Story and use it to bombard Fantasia with fireballs and a storm. With wooden Bark Troll, Bastian and his friends head for the Wandering Mountains to speak with the Childlike Empress, who asks Bastian to find the Neverending Story using the Auryn. Falkor, Barky, the gnomes, and Rockbiter's son, Junior, help him, but a "wish overload" scatters them all across Earth, where Barky ends up in a conifer forest, Falkor saves Junior from falling to his death near Mount Rushmore, and the gnomes arrive in Nome, Alaska. Bastian locates Falkor and Junior, and Falkor flies off to find the others while Junior stays at Bastian's house. Rockbiter sadly informs his wife that Junior is gone, and the Nasties provoke them to quarrel.

Nicole takes the Auryn from Bastian's room, discovers its wishing abilities, and takes it on a shopping trip to the local mall. Bark Troll arrives at Bastian's house disguised as a garden plant, while the Gnomes are mailed to him in a box. The reunited group go in search of Nicole, but the Nasties find the Auryn first, whereupon giant crustacean creatures appear in Fantasia to kill the Empress and her advisors. Everyone in the mall turns evil, including Mr. Coreander and Bastian and Nicole’s parents. Bastian is struck by lightning, and begins to succumb to the wills of the Nasties, but Nicole saves him, and Bastian recovers the Auryn and the book in a fight. The Fantasians return to Fantasia, which is restored to its former magnificence. Bastian and Nicole manage to keep their parents from divorcing, and Junior is reunited with his parents. Nicole and Bastian return to school the next day and find that Bastian has changed Slip and the Nasties into friendly classmates, and Bastian returns the Neverending Story to Mr. Coreander.

Cast 
 Jason James Richter as Bastian Balthazar Bux
 Melody Kay as Nicole Baxter, Bastian's stepsister
 Jack Black as Slip ("The Nasty"), the leader of the Nasties
 Freddie Jones as Carl Conrad Coreander, a former local librarian; Old Man of Wandering Mountain
 Julie Cox as The Childlike Empress
 Moya Brady as Urgl
 Tony Robinson as Engywook
 Tracey Ellis as Jane Bux, Bastian's stepmother
 Kevin McNulty as Barney Bux, Bastian's father
 Frederick Warder as Mr. Rockbiter Sr.
 William Todd-Jones as Mrs. Rockbiter
 Dave Forman as Mr. Rockbiter Jr.
 Gordon Robertson as Falkor
 Kaefan Shaw as Bark Troll
 Mark Acheson as the Janitor
 Ryan Bollman as Dog, a member of the Nasties
 Carole Finn as Marcia/Mookie, a member of the Nasties and Slip's girlfriend
 Nicole Parker as Coil, a member of the Nasties
 Adrien Dorval as Rage, a member of the Nasties

Voices 
 William Hootkins as Bark Troll; Falkor
 Mac McDonald as Mrs. Rockbiter
 Gary Martin as Rockbiter; Mr. Rockchewer; Junior Rockchewer

Soundtrack

Production
In February 1993 at the American Film Market, Peter MacDonald was hired by CineVox Entertainment to direct fantasy adventure, The Neverending Story III from a script by Jeff Lieberman with production scheduled for Summer of that year. The film was announced with a budget at $25 million with producer Dieter Geissler, who produced the first two entries, and Tim Hampton with production to take place for six months in Vancouver and Germany. Principal photography began in August of that year. The film's production was motivated by the success of the previous two entries which had collectively grossed $150 million worldwide with the second entry also a robust seller on home video. As both previous entries had struggled theatrically in the United States, the producers made a conscious effort to tailor the third entry for the American market with Jason James Richter cast as Bastian on the basis of his recognition from Free Willy. Author of the original book, Michael Ende had absolutely no involvement with the film with producer Tim Hampton commenting:
We own all rights to the title now. Ende had certain rights on the previous two movies. He had a lot of control on Wolfgang Petersen's The NeverEnding Story. On George Miller's THE NEXT CHAPTER, it was more along the lines of we had to show him what we were doing at all times and then he'd give us his opinion. But here we're clear and free to do what we want.

Release 
The NeverEnding Story III was first released in Germany on October 27, 1994 by Warner Bros. under the Family Entertainment label. In the Philippines, it was released by Jemah Films on January 4, 1995, with an advanced screening on January 2. The film was given a limited release in the United States on February 2, 1996 by Miramax Films under their Family Films label.

Reception

Critical response 
Variety wrote: "The NeverEnding Story lives up to its title in the worst way possible with this third outing, a charmless, desperate reworking of the franchise that might just as well be subtitled 'Bastian Goes to High School'".

Box office 
By late December 1994, the film grossed $5 million in Germany.

References

External links 
 
 
 

1994 films
1990s fantasy adventure films
American children's adventure films
American children's fantasy films
American fantasy adventure films
American sequel films
Films about bullying
American films about Halloween
Films about wish fulfillment
Films about dysfunctional families
Films directed by Peter MacDonald
Puppet films
Films shot in South Dakota
Films shot in Vancouver
German children's films
German fantasy adventure films
English-language German films
German sequel films
High fantasy films
Miramax films
The NeverEnding Story (film series)
Warner Bros. films
CineVox films
1990s American films
1990s German films